Vyazutinskaya is a rural locality (a village) in Ilezskoye Rural Settlement, Tarnogsky District, Vologda Oblast, Russia. The population was 5 as of 2002.

Geography 
Vyazutinskaya is located 36 km northeast of Tarnogsky Gorodok (the district's administrative centre) by road. Michurovskaya is the nearest rural locality.

References 

Rural localities in Tarnogsky District